Vis medicatrix naturae (literally "the healing power of nature", and also known as natura medica) is the Latin rendering of the Greek Νόσων φύσεις ἰητροί ("Nature is the physician(s) of diseases"), a phrase attributed to Hippocrates. While the phrase is not actually attested in his corpus, it nevertheless sums up one of the guiding principles of Hippocratic medicine, which is that organisms left alone can often heal themselves (cf. the Hippocratic primum non nocere).

Hippocrates
Hippocrates believed that an organism is not passive to injuries or disease, but rebalances itself to counteract them. The state of illness, therefore, is not a malady but an effort of the body to overcome a disturbed equilibrium. It is this capacity of organisms to correct imbalances that distinguishes them from non-living matter. 

From this follows the medical approach that “nature is the best physician” or “nature is the healer of disease”. To do this Hippocrates considered a doctor’s chief aim was to help this natural tendency of the body by observing its action, removing obstacles to its action, and thus allow an organism to recover its own health. This underlies such Hippocratic practices as blood letting in which a perceived excess of a humors is removed, and thus was taken to help the rebalancing of the body's humor.

Renaissance and modern history
After Hippocrates, the idea of vis medicatrix naturae continued to play a key role in medicine. In the early Renaissance, the physician and early scientist Paracelsus had the idea of “inherent balsam”. Thomas Sydenham, in the 18th century considered fever as a healing force of nature.  
 
In the nineteenth-century, vis medicatrix naturae came to be interpreted as vitalism, and in this form it came to underlie the philosophical framework of homeopathy, chiropractic, hydropathy, osteopathy and naturopathy.

Relation to homeostasis
Walter Cannon's notion of homeostasis also has its origins in vis medicatrix naturae. "All that I have done thus far in reviewing the various protective and stabilizing devices of the body is to present a modern interpretation of the natural vis medicatrix.". In this, Cannon stands in contrast to Claude Bernard (the father of modern physiology), and his earlier idea of milieu interieur that he proposed to replace vitalistic ideas about the body. However, both the notions of homeostasis and milieu interieur are ones concerned with how the body's physiology regulates itself through multiple mechanical equilibrium adjustment feedbacks rather than nonmechanistic life forces.

Relation to evolutionary medicine
More recently, evolutionary medicine has identified many medical symptoms such as fever, inflammation, sickness behavior, and morning sickness as evolved adaptations that function as darwinian medicatrix naturae due to their selection as means to protect, heal, or restore the injured, infected or physiologically disrupted body.

See also 
Appeal to nature
Medicus curat, natura sanat
Royal Commission on Animal Magnetism

References

Latin medical words and phrases
Ancient Greek medicine
Natural philosophy
Biology theories

ja:自然治癒力